was once considered to be the first professional Japanese animated film ever made. It was made by Ōten Shimokawa in 1917 to be shown in a cinema, in this case, in the Asakusa Kinema Kurabu, a theater in Tokyo managed directly by the film company Tenkatsu. It was preceded by Shimokawa's early work,  and Otogawa Shinzo Gate of the Entrance from January 1917.

Production
In 1916, Tenkatsu, or Tennenshoku Katsudō Shashin Kabushiki Gaisha ("Natural Color Moving Picture Company"), began experimenting with animation with the manga artist Hekoten/Oten Shimokawa. Shimokawa produced the animation by drawing with a chalk on a blackboard, redrawing as necessary to create the animation effect. Mukuzo Imokawa was a manga character that Shimokawa used in his manga.

See also
 List of lost films

References

External links
 

1917 films
1917 animated films
1910s animated short films
1910s anime films
Anime short films
Lost animated films
Japanese silent films
Lost Japanese films
Japanese black-and-white films
1917 lost films
1917 short films